Melamaiyur is a census town in Chengalpattu district in the Indian state of Tamil Nadu.

Demographics
 India census, Melamaiyur had a population of 5155. Males constitute 50% of the population and females 50%. Melamaiyur has an average literacy rate of 81%, higher than the national average of 59.5%: male literacy is 84%, and female literacy is 78%. In Melamaiyur, 8% of the population is under 6 years of age.

References

Cities and towns in Kanchipuram district